Benny Johan Einar Lekström (born 19 February 1981) Swedish former footballer who played as a goalkeeper. He is a current goalkeeper coach of IF Brommapojkarna.

He has previously played for Enskede IK, IF Brommapojkarna, FK Mjølner, Tromsø IL and IK Sirius.

Career
Born in Enskede, Sweden, Lekström played for Hammarby IF from 2005 to 2007, and left Hammarby on a free transfer to IF Brommapojkarna, where he played from 2008 to 2010. After one season in the Norwegian club Mjølner, Lekstrøm signed a two-year deal with Tromsø on 19 October 2011, starting from January 2012.

He represented IK Sirius during one season in 2016, before leaving the club by mutual consent.

On 14 July 2017, Lekström returned to Hammarby on a six month-contract. He left the club at the end of 2018. On 22 February 2019, he then joined IF Brommapojkarna to replace first keeper Hampus Elgán, who had been injured. On 5 August 2019 the club announced, that Lekström would continue at the club as a goalkeeper coach.

Career statistics

Honours
IK Sirius
Superettan: 2016

References

External links 
 
 

1981 births
Living people
Swedish footballers
Association football goalkeepers
IF Brommapojkarna players
Hammarby Fotboll players
FK Mjølner players
Tromsø IL players
IK Sirius players
Allsvenskan players
Superettan players
Eliteserien players
Norwegian First Division players
Swedish expatriate footballers
Expatriate footballers in Norway
Swedish expatriate sportspeople in Norway